William C. Taylor is co-founder and editor of Fast Company Magazine, with Alan Webber. He is a former editor of the Harvard Business Review. He is an adjunct professor at Babson College and wrote a column in the Money section of The Guardian newspaper.

Taylor received his B.A. from Princeton University and his M.B.A. from the MIT Sloan School of Management.

References

External links
Babson faculty page
Biography

Year of birth missing (living people)
Living people
MIT Sloan School of Management alumni
Princeton University alumni
Harvard Business School people